Gholam-Hossein Elham (born 1959) is an Iranian conservative and principlist politician who held several posts during the term of the former President Mahmoud Ahmedinejad.

Early life
Elham was born in western Iran in 1959. He holds a PhD in criminology from Tarbiat Modares University.

Career
Elham was a member of the Guardian Council from 2003 to 2008 and also held the post of spokesperson of the council. He served as government spokesperson during the first term of the former President Mahmoud Ahmedinejad.

He was appointed minister of justice upon the death of Jamal Karimi-Rad. He was in office until 2009 when Morteza Bakhtiari replaced him in the post. Elham served as Ahmedinejad's representative to the Islamic Republic of Iran Broadcasting's supervisory council.

Personal life
Elham's spouse, Fatemeh Rajabi, is a journalist known for her support for Mahmoud Ahmadinejad and also for her fierce criticism of former-presidents Akbar Rafsanjani and Mohammad Khatami.

See also

Council for Spreading Mahmoud Ahmadinejad's Thoughts

References

External links

1959 births
Living people
People from Andimeshk
Tarbiat Modares University alumni
Government ministers of Iran
Spokespersons
Members of the Guardian Council
Spokespersons of the Government of Iran
Front of Islamic Revolution Stability politicians
Presidential advisers of Iran
Ministers of Justice of Iran